Gustavo Kuerten and Fernando Meligeni were the defending champions.  Kuerten did not participate this year.  Meligeni partnered Filippo Messori, losing in the quarterfinals.

Donald Johnson and Francisco Montana won in the final 6–1, 2–6, 6–1, against David Roditi and Fernon Wibier.

Seeds

  Donald Johnson /  Francisco Montana (champions)
  Luis Lobo /  Javier Sánchez (first round)
  Neil Broad /  Piet Norval (first round)
  David Adams /  Daniel Orsanic (first round)

Draw

Draw

External links
 Draw

Portugal Open
1998 ATP Tour
Estoril Open